The 2008–09 Logan Cup was a first-class cricket competition held in Zimbabwe from 26 March 2009 – 8 May 2009. It was won by Easterns, who remained unbeaten in the competition, and topped the table with 93 points, winning five of their six matches.

Points table

References

2009 in cricket
2009 in Zimbabwean sport
Domestic cricket competitions in 2008–09
Logan Cup